Andriy Mykolayovych Vasylytchuk (born 23 October 1965) is a retired Ukrainian professional footballer. He made his professional debut in the Soviet Second League in 1989 for FC Spartak Oryol.

References

1965 births
Living people
Sportspeople from Lviv
Soviet footballers
Ukrainian footballers
Ukraine international footballers
Ukrainian Premier League players
Russian Premier League players
FC Nyva Ternopil players
FC Halychyna Drohobych players
FC Karpaty Lviv players
FC Zhemchuzhina Sochi players
FC Tekstilshchik Kamyshin players
FC Oryol players
Association football defenders
Expatriate footballers in Poland